Louis Herbert (born 27 June 1994) is a former Australian rules footballer who played for the Gold Coast Football Club in the Australian Football League (AFL).

He made his debut in round 18, 2014 against the Brisbane Lions.

Statistics

|- style="background-color: #EAEAEA"
! scope="row" style="text-align:center" | 2014
|
| 39 || 3 || 0 || 0 || 7 || 4 || 11 || 1 || 7 || 0.0 || 0.0 || 2.3 || 1.3 || 3.7 || 0.3 || 2.3
|- class="sortbottom"
! colspan=3| Career
! 3
! 0
! 0
! 7
! 4
! 11
! 1
! 7
! 0.0
! 0.0
! 2.3
! 1.3
! 3.7
! 0.3
! 2.3
|}

Personal life
Louis Herbert attended Emmanuel College Warrnambool.

References

External links 

1994 births
Living people
Gold Coast Football Club players
Greater Western Victoria Rebels players
Australian rules footballers from Victoria (Australia)
North Ballarat Football Club players